Friedrich von Boetticher (14 October 1881 – 28 September 1967) was a German military officer who served as the military attaché of Germany to Washington DC from 1933 to 1941. While serving as attaché, he provided many intelligence reports to Berlin documenting the isolationist movement in the United States, and the state of military preparedness before Pearl Harbor.

References 

20th-century German diplomats
1881 births
1967 deaths
German Army generals of World War II
German military attachés
Lieutenant generals of the German Army (Wehrmacht)
Recipients of the Iron Cross, 1st class
Recipients of the Order of Military Merit (Bulgaria)
Friedrich
Military personnel from Saxony